Fred Tatasciore  is an American voice actor who has provided voices in animated and live-action films, television shows, and video games. He is known for voicing the Hulk and Beast in various Marvel media and Solomon Grundy in various DC media. Other characters he has voiced include Yosemite Sam, Taz, Soldier: 76, Shao Kahn and Kakuzu.

Career
He is known for portraying characters with deep and powerful voices, though in recent years has expanded his range.

He has voiced the Hulk in multiple Marvel projects, including Marvel: Ultimate Alliance 2, The Avengers: Earth's Mightiest Heroes and Avengers Assemble.

His best known video game roles include Damon Baird in the Gears of War series, Saren Arterius in the Mass Effect series, Zeratul in StarCraft II and Heroes of the Storm, Soldier: 76 in Blizzard's first-person shooter Overwatch and Xür in Bungie's first-person shooter, Destiny.

He voiced the character "8" in the Tim Burton-produced film 9. He has also voiced Neftin Prog in Ratchet & Clank: Into the Nexus, Nikolai Belinski in the Call of Duty franchise, Megatron in Transformers: War for Cybertron, Fall of Cybertron, Dark of the Moon and Rise of the Dark Spark, Tookit in ThunderCats and the Business Cat in the Cartoon Hangover web series Our New Electrical Morals administered by Frederator Studios.

In the Skylanders franchise, he voices Snap Shot, Slam Bam, Warnado, Strykore, Zook and Cuckoo Clocker.

He currently plays the main role of Bajoran tactical officer Shaxs on Star Trek: Lower Decks.

Filmography

Animation

Anime

Feature films

Direct-to-video and television films

Shorts

Video games

Theme parks

References

External links

 
 
 
 

Living people
20th-century American male actors
21st-century American male actors
American impressionists (entertainers)
American male video game actors
American male voice actors
American people of Italian descent
Male actors from New York City
Year of birth missing (living people)